John Walter Baxter CBE (4 June 1917 in London–21 October 2003) was a British civil engineer.

Baxter left Westminster City School at the age of 16. He was a graduate of the City & Guilds College, with a BSc in engineering.

He worked for Trussed Concrete Steel Company from 1936 to 1941, Royal Dutch Shell from 1941 to 1952. He met Guy Maunsell, and joined the firm of Maunsell, Posford and Pavry, in 1952. John Baxter was a founding partner of the new firm of G Maunsell & Partners in 1955, and was senior partner from 1959 to 1980. He was responsible for designing the Westway.
His work appears in ICE Proceedings. 
He was appointed CBE in the 1974 New Year Honours and was elected president of the Smeatonian Society of Civil Engineers in 1986.

He married Jessie in 1941 and they had a daughter.

References

British civil engineers
1917 births
2003 deaths
Engineers from London
Alumni of Imperial College London
Presidents of the Institution of Civil Engineers
Presidents of the Smeatonian Society of Civil Engineers